Alexander Gordon (9 June 1841 – 21 February 1931) was an English Unitarian minister and religious historian. A prolific contributor to the Dictionary of National Biography, he wrote for it well over 700 articles dealing mainly with nonconformists.

Life

Gordon was born in Coventry, the son of John Gordon, a Unitarian minister. He was an undergraduate at the University of Edinburgh from 1856 to 1859, then trained at Manchester New College in London, and studied under Ignaz von Döllinger in Munich. He was a minister at Aberdeen, at Hope Street Unitarian Chapel in Liverpool alongside Charles Wicksteed, and at the Octagon Chapel, Norwich, before settling in Belfast in 1877 at its First Presbyterian Church. He was Principal of the Unitarian Home Missionary College, Manchester, from 1890 to 1911.

Notes

 

1841 births
1931 deaths
People from Coventry
Alumni of the University of Edinburgh
19th-century British historians
English Unitarian ministers
Historians of Puritanism
Irish non-subscribing Presbyterian ministers
Alumni of Harris Manchester College, Oxford
20th-century British historians